The Battle of Valkininkai took place at 6 March 1706 close to the town of Valkininkai in the Grand Duchy of Lithuania during the Great Northern War.

History 
A Swedish detachment of 1,000 dragoons sent out by Charles XII of Sweden from Grodno under Carl Gustaf Dücker sought to meet up with a larger Polish contingent under Józef Potocki and Jan Kazimierz Sapieha the Elder at Valkininkai, before marching towards Vilnius in order to secure the Swedish connection to Swedish Livonia which had been disturbed by Russian forces ever since the Battle of Gemauerthof. However, at the same time an allied force of about 4,600–7,000 Russians, Poles and Lithuanians under Christian Felix Bauer, Michał Serwacy Wiśniowiecki and Grzegorz Antoni Ogiński marched in their direction in order to beat the pro-Swedish Poles and Lithuanians before regrouping with their Swedish allies. The Swedish and Russian–Polish forces soon, rather unexpectedly, stumbled upon each other outside of the town where a fierce fight took place. The Swedes repulsed two attacks executed by their enemies, before withdrawing a distance away to some woods, in order to initiate a third attack prepared by the allied forces. Meanwhile, the battle was witnessed from a distance away by the Swedish–friendly Poles and Lithuanians who had yet to participate in the fighting. The Swedes soon, however, counterattacked on their own and managed to beat the allied forces from the field, after which the Poles and Lithuanians on the Swedish side decided the intervene and pursued the allies for a distance. The battle resulted in more than 60 wounded Swedes and up to 50 killed and 100 wounded Russians and another 70 killed and equally many wounded Poles and Lithuanians siding with the Russians. The Swedes soon arrived at Vilnius where they captured a large bulk of Russian supplies.

References

Gustaf Adlerfeld, translation, James Ford. The Genuine History of Charles XII. King of Sweden. Booksellers in town and country, 1742

Olkieniki 1706
1706 in Europe
Olkieniki (1706)
Olkieniki (1706)
Olkieniki (1706)
Olkieniki (1706)
1706 in Lithuania
Military history of Lithuania